Commemorative coins have been issued in Bulgaria since 1965 by the Bulgarian National Bank, headquartered in Sofia, and minted by the Bulgarian Mint (Bulgarian: Монетен двор).

Commemorative coins issued since 1965

See also

 Bulgarian lev
 Bulgarian Mint
 Bulgaria and the euro

References
 

Bulgaria
Coins
Coins of Bulgaria
Coins